Yonatan Aklilu (born 15 June 1979) is an Ethiopian Pentecostal pastor. Yonatan is known for his project called Melkam Wetat. On 6 September 2020, Ethiopian  Prime Minister Abiy Ahmed offered 25,000 euros for his contribution to the youth of Ethiopia by that he had been awarded through the Hessian Peace Prize.

Background 
Yonatan Alkilu was born in Kebri Mangest, in present-day Oromia Region, Ethiopia and raised in Negele Arsi, Oromia, Ethiopia. He completed his primary and secondary school in Negele Arsi. Yonatan received his Bachelor of Arts in Accounting and Finance from Arba Minch University. He had served as a teacher at the Adventist College, Kuyera Africa Beza and the Rift Valley University College, for he had a great ambition to become a teacher since his childhood. But Yonatan did not follow this profession, but became a Gospel teacher, and launched a religious TV channel which is called Marcil after founding a church named Addis Kidan Kahinat.  

In 2017, Yonatan also launched a project called Melkam Wetat (Excellent Youth), which is more focused on the youth of Ethiopia regardless of their religious background, and has a mission to free young people from their difficult behaviors and morally change them to become good citizens. More than 100,000 students graduated from this project. Melkam Wetat's head office is now in Hawassa, Ethiopia.

On 21 December 2020, on behalf of his project, Melkam Wetat, Yonatan donated 10 million Ethiopian birr for a school feeding project that was launched by the Addis Ababa city administrator. In late 2022, Yonatan was accused by the Ethiopian Orthodox Church of "hate speech", by insulting the theology of the Church and view of Virgin Mary and saints. The Church then summon six leaders in Inter-Religious Council, from Islamic Affairs. According to Abune Abraham, head of the patriarchate office, the church would not continue to foster in the council as anti-Orthodox sentiment grow in the country.

References 

Ethiopian Protestant missionaries
Ethiopian Protestants
1979 births
Living people
People from Oromia Region